Stuart & Sons is an Australian manufacturer of handcrafted grand pianos. The company is based in Tumut in New South Wales.

History 
Wayne Stuart founded the company in 1990 as Stuart & Sons Terra Australia Pvt Limited. The company later evolved and formed a partnership with Albert Music. 

The company used to be based in Newcastle but in 2015, it relocated to a town at the base of the Snowy Mountains.

Pianos 
Stuart & Sons uses Australian timbers for construction. 

The Dutch-Australian pianist and teacher Gerard Willems used a Stuart & Sons piano when recording the complete piano sonata cycle of Ludwig van Beethoven during 1999 and 2000.

Stuart & Sons created a grand piano with 14 more keys than are found on a standard piano, for a total of 102 keys or eight and one half octaves. A model with 20 extra keys was built in 2018.

Piano locations
Stuart pianos are used at many locations throughout Australia, including:
 Sydney Conservatorium of Music
 Government House, Sydney
 Admiralty House, Sydney
 Powerhouse Museum Sydney
 Tasmanian Conservatorium of Music 
Australian Elizabethan Theatre Trust
 Clancy Auditorium Central Queensland University
 Central Queensland Conservatorium of Music, Mackay, Queensland
 Beleura House and Gardens, Mornington, Victoria

See also
Other Australian piano manufacturers

Historic:
 Beale Piano
 Wertheim Piano

References

External links
Stuart and Sons Company Website
Powerhouse Museum
Silenced huon piano begins to shine
Notes from heaven: piano on a grand scale
Grand piano is key to innovation

Companies based in Newcastle, New South Wales
Musical instrument manufacturing companies of Australia
Piano manufacturing companies
Manufacturing companies established in 1990
Australian companies established in 1990
Australian brands